1996 Yokohama Flügels season

Review and events

League results summary

League results by round

Competitions

Domestic results

J.League

Emperor's Cup

J.League Cup

Player statistics

 † player(s) joined the team after the opening of this season.

Transfers

In:

Out:

Transfers during the season

In
 Denilson Antonio Paludo (on June)

Out
 Takashi Sakurai (loan to Gimnasia on August)

Awards

J.League Best XI:  Seigō Narazaki,  Motohiro Yamaguchi,  Masakiyo Maezono

References

Other pages
 J. League official site
 Yokohama F. Marinos official web site

Yokohama Flugels
Yokohama Flügels seasons